Qingnianhu Park (literally "Youth Lake") is a city park in Beijing, situated in Dongcheng District, west of Andingmenwai Street. Qingnianhu, or Youth Lake, accounts for about a third of the park's area. The lake was dug by teenaged volunteers organized by the local government in 1958. Public transportation can be used to get to the park, which lies just outside Ditan station served by bus lines 18, 104, and 108. An entrance fee of 2 yuan is required as of 2012.

Features
Over 16,000 trees are spread across different scenic areas. Qingnianhu park is known for its modern arts sculptures that complement the natural areas. Qingnianhu Water World is a huge outdoor swimming pool inside the park. The park also features numerous attractions for children including bumper cars, a mini race circuit, and a swinging pirate ship. Adults can enjoy activities such as gate-ball, fishing, ice skating, and public fitness equipment. A small driving range, cafés, and a restaurant are also present.

See also
List of Beijing landmarks

External links
elong
Official website

Parks in Beijing
Dongcheng District, Beijing
1960 establishments in China
Artificial lakes